Adalbert is a German given name which means "noble bright" or "noble shining", derived from the words adal (meaning noble) and berht (shining or bright). Alternative spellings include Adelbart, Adelbert and Adalberto. Derivative names include Albert and Elbert.

Because St Adalbert of Prague (†997), early mediaeval missionary who became Czech, Polish and Hungarian patron saint, at his confirmation changed his name from native Vojtěch to Adalbert, this Germanic name has been artificially assigned to Slavonic Vojtěch/Wojciech ("he who is happy in battle") and via the same process have been the names Vojtěch and Adalbert connected with Hungarian name Béla (maybe "inner part") – so, in Central European settings these three names are taken as the equivalents, although they haven't any linguistic connection to each other.

Given name
 Adalbert (mystic) (8th century)
 Adalbert Begas (1836–1888), German painter
 Adalbert Czerny (1863–1941), Austrian pediatrician
 Adalbert Deșu (1909–1937), Romanian football player
 Adalbert Falk (1827–1900), German politician
 Adalbert Gyrowetz (1763–1850), Bohemian composer; born Vojtěch Matyáš Jírovec
 Adalbert Kraus (born 1937), German singer
 Adalbert Krüger (1832–1896), German astronomer
 Adalbert Pilch (1917–2004), Austrian artist
 Adalbert Schnizlein (1814–1868), German botanist 
 Adalbert Stifter (1805–1868), Austrian writer
 Adalbert von Blanc (1907–1976), German admiral
 Adalbert von Ladenberg (1798–1855), Prussian politician
 Adalbert Zafirov (born 1969), Bulgarian football player

Royal and religious leaders
 Adalbert, Duke of Alsace (died 723)
 Adalbert, Duke of Lorraine (1000–1048)
 Adalbert, Margrave of Austria (985–1055)
 Adalbert I, Margrave of Tuscany (820–886)
 Adalbert I of Ostrevent (died 652), abbot of Marchiennes
 Adalbert II, Count of Ballenstedt (1030–1083)
 Adalbert II, Margrave of Tuscany (875–915)
 Adalbert III of Bohemia (1145–1200), Archbishop of Salzburg, born Vojtěch Přemyslid
 Adalbert of Bavaria (1828–1875), German prince
 Adalbert of Egmond (died 710), Northumbrian missionary
 Adalbert of Hamburg (1000–1072), Archbishop of Hamburg
 Adalbert of Italy (936–971), Margrave of Ivrea
 Adalbert of Magdeburg (910–981), Archbishop of Magdeburg 
 Adalbert of Mainz (died 1137), Archbishop of Mainz
 Adalbert of Pomerania (1124–1162), Pomeranian bishop
 Adalbert of Prague (956–997), Bohemian missionary and saint, Bishop of Prague; born Vojtěch Slavnikid
 Adalbert of Prussia (1811–1873), German prince
 Adalbert of Saxony (1467–1484), Archbishop of Mainz

Surname
 Max Adalbert (1874–1933), German actor

See also
 Adelbert
 Adalberto
 Saint-Adalbert
 Vojtěch
 Béla (given name)

Masculine given names